Several naval ships of Germany were named Brummer after the blow-fly:

 : an armoured gunboat
  (1915): a 4,400-ton  mine-laying cruiser
 : an auxiliary gunnery training ship, launched 29 May 1935, commissioned 8 February 1936, sunk 15 April 1940
 : a minelayer, former Norwegian , captured 9 April 1940

German Navy ship names